Thameens Films is an Indian film production company based in Chennai, Tamil Nadu. It was founded in early 2000 by Shibu K, who is also running Thameens Maax Theatre & Thameens Release for distribution of movies mainly Tamil & Malayalam movies. They have distributed around 101 films in different languages across regions.

Thameens Films has acquired the Kerala theatrical rights of Vishal, Samantha starrer Irumbu Thirai which is slated for release in 11 May 2018.

In 2022 Thameens Films Distributed India's Biggest Movie 'RRR', Directed By Rajamouli.The Budget Of The Movie was above 450cr. Company bagged the distribution rights of kerala for 2022 biggest Industry hit Movie Vikram starring Kamal Haasan and directed   by Lokesh kanagaraj.

Filmography

Films Produced

Films Distributed under Thameens Films

Films Distributed under HR Pictures

References 

Film production companies based in Chennai
Indian companies established in 2000
2000 establishments in Tamil Nadu
Mass media companies established in 2000